West Stanley railway station was a railway station on the North Eastern Railway serving the town of Stanley in County Durham, England.

History
This deviation line allowed several steep rope-worked inclines (on the former Pontop and South Shields Railway section of the old Stanhope and Tyne Railway) to be avoided. Passenger stations on the loop line, including Shield Row, were opened on 1 February 1894.

On 1 January 1923 the NER amalgamated with other companies to form the London and North Eastern Railway (LNER). On 1 February 1934 the LNER renamed the station West Stanley.

The station was closed to regular passenger services on 23 May 1955.

Routes

Notes

References

External links
 West Stanley Station on navigable O.S. map

Disused railway stations in County Durham
Former North Eastern Railway (UK) stations
Railway stations in Great Britain opened in 1894
Railway stations in Great Britain closed in 1955